Miproxifene (INN) (former developmental code name DP-TAT-59) is a nonsteroidal selective estrogen receptor modulator (SERM) of the triphenylethylene group that was never marketed. It is a derivative of afimoxifene (4-hydroxytamoxifen) in which an additional 4-isopropyl group is present in the β-phenyl ring. The drug has been found to be 3- to 10-fold more potent than tamoxifen in inhibiting breast cancer cell growth in in vitro models. Miproxifene is the active metabolite of miproxifene phosphate (TAT-59), a phosphate ester and prodrug of miproxifene that was developed to improve its water solubility. Miproxifene phosphate was under development for the treatment of breast cancer and reached phase III clinical trials for this indication but development was discontinued.

References

Phenols
Dimethylamino compounds
Hormonal antineoplastic drugs
Human drug metabolites
Selective estrogen receptor modulators
Triphenylethylenes